Arabsalim is a populated area in Nabatiyeh District, in southern Lebanon.

Location
Arabsalim is located 87 km from Beirut, at an altitude of 700 meters above sea level

History 
The town’s name, which comes from the Phoenician language, also appears in Pharaonic records as Rab Salim or “the god of peace.” Found here is a shrine to the prophet Salim, which has important archeological significance.

See also
Mohamad Issa

References

External links
 Aarab Salim, Localiban

Populated places in Nabatieh District